FK Bratstvo 07 is a football club based in the village of Zhitoshe near Prilep, North Macedonia. They are currently competing in the Macedonian Third League (South Division).

History
The club was founded in 2007.

References

External links 

Club info at MacedonianFootball 
Football Federation of Macedonia 

Bratstvo 07 Žitoše
Association football clubs established in 2007
2007 establishments in the Republic of Macedonia
FK